Newbery is a surname.

People
Chantelle Newbery (born 1977), Australian Olympic diver 
David Newbery (born 1943), British economist
Eduardo Newbery (1878–1908), Argentine odontologist and aerostat pilot
Francis Newbery (disambiguation), several people
James Newbery (1843–1895), Australian industrial chemist
John Newbery (1713–1767), British book publisher
Jorge Newbery (1875–1914), Argentine aviator
Linda Newbery (born 1952), British author
Robert Newbery (born 1979), Australian Olympic diver

See also 
 Newberry
 Newbury (surname)
 Newbery Medal, an award for American children's literature named after John Newbery